The Least of These is a 2019 drama film based on the true story of Graham Staines, an Australian missionary working in India helping lepers. The film is directed by Aneesh Daniel and written by Andrew Matthews. Stephen Baldwin plays Staines.  The film was shot in 2012 in India.

Development
Stephen Baldwin said on The Today Show he was brought in to help develop the character and then was given the role.

Plot
As the social fabric of life in rural India disintegrates in the late 1990s, journalist Manav Banerjee (Sharman Joshi) moves with his pregnant wife to the State of Orissa in hope of a better life and the promise of a lucrative career. When speculation mounts that local Australian missionary Graham Staines (Stephen Baldwin) is illegally proselytizing leprosy patients, Manav agrees to investigate undercover for the newspaper. What he finds is a series of revelations that are difficult to fathom and even harder to explain, and Manav is forced to make a choice between his own ambition and the truth. In the end, his actions spark a tragic event that is felt around the world. Based on a true story and shot on location in India.

Reception

Critical response
Devesh Sharma of Filmfare giving three stars out of five says, "Indeed, it's the performances that make you sit up and take notice of this flawed film.  It does introduce you to the horrors of leprosy, at one time you feel you're watching something about The Holocaust. But then it delves into OTT melodrama, thereby losing its balance...."

Philip Martin writing for Arkansas Democrat-Gazette says, "The Least of These is a watchable faith-based film made by a group from Texas, filmed on location in India under the entirely orthodox direction of Aneesh Daniel." and  "While there's a certain obviousness to the plotting, and a necessary streamlining of knotty issues into easily digested factoids, for the most part The Least of These does a good job of communicating the selflessness of people like Staines and the genuinely inspiring example of his widow, Gladys (Shari Rigby)."

Writing for The Times of India Renuka Vyavahare rates the film with three stars out of five and opines, "Like the subject it tackles, Aneesh Daniel's execution and Andrew Matthew's writing seems a tad agenda driven." Vyavahare further observes, "Instead of letting people decide for themselves, the narrative tells them what to believe and that's a bit of a put off". "The facts behind the gruesome murders, for which Bajrang Dal member Dara Singh is serving a life sentence, are watered down to the extent that the movie will offend nobody except those seeking to draw connections between the killings in the late 1990s and the current spate of attacks on minority groups," writes Nandini Ramnath for Scroll.in.

Cast
Sharman Joshi 	... 	Manav Banerjee
Stephen Baldwin 	... 	Graham Staines
Shari Rigby 	... 	Gladys Staines
Manoj Mishra 	... 	Mahendra
Prakash Belawadi 	... 	Kedar Mishra
Aditi Chengappa 	... 	Shanti Banerjee
Aneesh Daniel 	... 	House Agent 
 Campbell Ellis 	... 	Philip Staines
 Emily Ellis 	... 	Esther Staines
 Isaac Ellis 	... 	Timothy Staines
Surender sahil verma

References

External links

2019 films
American films based on actual events
Protestant missionaries in India
Films set in 1999
Leprosy in India
Films about Christianity
2010s English-language films